The Accra Sports Stadium, formerly named the Ohene Djan Stadium, is a multi-use stadium (40,000-capacity, all-seater) located in Accra. Ghana, mostly used for association football matches. It is also used for rugby union.

Overview
The stadium was inaugurated in 1962 by a football match played between Accra XI and Kumasi XI.
Originally known as the Accra Sports Stadium, the stadium was renamed after Ohene Djan, the country's first Director of Sports, in 2004 after renovations. Its renaming was quite controversial and opposed by the Ga people. There has been ongoing controversy about the name of the stadium. On June 16, 2011, the name 'Ohene Djan Stadium' on the stadium building was changed to 'Accra Sports Stadium' without any official announcement by the Accra Metropolitan Assembly supported by the National Democratic Congress Government. It has since been reverted.

As a designated venue of some of the 2008 African Cup of Nations matches, the stadium was rebuilt, upgraded, and modernized to meet FIFA standards. Work on the stadium was completed in October 2007. It was inaugurated with a four-nation tournament that Ghana won (the Zenith Cup).

The stadium is also the home of one of Africa's most popular clubs, Hearts of Oak as well as Accra Lions FC and Great Olympics, but Ghana's national team matches are sometimes played there.

During the 2000 African Cup of Nations in Ghana and Nigeria, the stadium hosted 9 matches, and was also the venue of the 1978 final.

The venue has also hosted important professional boxing events, numbering 91 professional boxing programs as of August 2020. Perhaps the most famous one took place on Saturday, November 6, 1976, when Ghanaian David Kotei, the World Boxing Council's world Featherweight champion, lost his championship to future International Boxing Hall of Fame member, Mexican-American Danny Lopez by a 15 rounds unanimous decision. This program also featured a bout between undefeated, 29-0 prospect Sulley Shittu and Felix Figueroa, which Shittu won by 8 rounds decision. The crowd for this event has been estimated at over 100,000 fans.

See also
Accra Sports Stadium disaster
Ghana national theatre
Accra International Conference Center

Notes and references

External links

 Ghana-pedia webpage - Ohene Djan Sports Stadium
New Work-in-Progress Photos - October 2007
Photo at worldstadiums.com
Photos at fussballtempel.net
Stadium design Moreno Marrazzo

Football venues in Ghana
Athletics (track and field) venues in Ghana
Ghana
Sports venues in Ghana
Sport in Accra
Buildings and structures in Accra
Sports venues completed in 1952